Sri Lankans in Bermuda refer to Sri Lankans living in Bermuda. As of 2005, there are an estimated 400 living and working there. Sri Lankans in Bermuda are known for their giving in times of need for Sri Lanka, such as the Sri Lankan Civil War and the Boxing Day Tsunami. In 1979, there were only 6 Sri Lankans living in Bermuda.

Organisations
 Bermuda Help Sri Lanka Relief Fund

See also
 Sri Lankan diaspora
 Asian American

References

External links

Asian Caribbean
Ethnic groups in Bermuda
Bermudian people of Sri Lankan descent
Sri Lankan diaspora